A Graveyard of Empty Bottles is a stand alone EP by The Dogs D'Amour, released in 1989. Despite being an EP it was the first of the band's releases to enter the UK Albums Chart top 100, reaching #16. It was the Dogs D'Amour's highest ever charting release.

All guitars on the album are acoustic. (Nah. There's loads of electric guitar on this album)

The album was also released in a limited edition 10" numbered vinyl format.

Track listing
 "I Think It's Love Again"
 "So Once Was I"	
 "Comfort of the Devil"
 "Saviour"
 "Errol Flynn"	
 "Bullet Proof Poet"	
 "When the Dream Has Gone"	
 "Angel (So You Shall Be)"

Band
Tyla – vocals, guitar
Jo "Dog" Almeida – guitars
Steve James – bass
Bam – drums

References

1989 albums
The Dogs D'Amour albums